József Duró (26 June 1966 – May 2022) was a Hungarian football manager and player.

Playing career
Duró played abroad in Malaysia for Jahanja FC before moving to Qatar SC in 1999.

Honours 
Kispest Honvéd
Nemzeti Bajnokság I: 1992–93

References

External links
 

1966 births
2022 deaths
People from Berettyóújfalu
Sportspeople from Hajdú-Bihar County
Hungarian footballers
Association football midfielders
Hungary international footballers
Debreceni VSC players
Vasas SC players
BFC Siófok players
Budapest Honvéd FC players
Bnei Yehuda Tel Aviv F.C. players
Budapesti VSC footballers
Hungarian football managers
Budapest Honvéd FC managers
Dorogi FC managers
Vecsési FC managers
Hungarian expatriate footballers
Hungarian expatriate sportspeople in Israel
Expatriate footballers in Israel
Hungarian expatriate sportspeople in Qatar
Expatriate footballers in Qatar